Tizdang-e Olya (also Romanized as Tīzdang-e ‘Olyā; also known as Tez Dīng and Tīzdīng-e Bālā) is a village in Mahur Rural District, Mahvarmilani District, Mamasani County, Fars Province, Iran. At the 2006 census, its population was 23, in 5 families.

References 

Populated places in Mamasani County